The Song of Scorpions is a 2017 Swiss-French-Singaporean Rajasthani language drama film written and directed by Anup Singh. Produced by Feather Light Films and KNM, the films stars Golshifteh Farahani as a tribal woman learning the ancient art of healing and Irrfan Khan as a camel trader in his final film role.

The Song of Scorpions had its world premiere at the 70th Locarno Film Festival in Locarno, Switzerland on August 9, 2017.

Plot

According to an ancient myth, the sting of a scorpion in Jaisalmer, Rajasthan can cause death in less than 24 hours and the only cure is the song sung by a scorpion singer which counters the poison of the scorpion. The Song of Scorpions is the story of a tribal woman Nooran (Golshifteh Farahani) who takes lessons from her grandmother Zubaida (Waheeda Rehman) so as to become a scorpion singer like her. After being struck by a tragedy and snubbed by the people of her village, Nooran is offered a marriage proposal by Aadam (Irrfan Khan), a camel trader who has been in love with Nooran ever since he heard her voice. But soon after getting married, Nooran receives another setback which sets her on a path of vengeance to redeem all the misdoings that were inflicted upon her.

Cast

 Golshifteh Farahani as Nooran 
 Irrfan Khan as Aadam
 Waheeda Rehman as Zubeidaa
 Shashank Arora as Munna
 Kritika Pande as Amina
 Sara Arjun as Ayesha
 Shefali Bhushan as Shakila
 Tillotama Shome as Lady of The Night

Production

It was reported that the lead actors of the film Irrfan Khan and Golshifteh Farahani began shooting for the film in Jaisalmer, Rajasthan in December 2015.

Release

The Song of Scorpions had its world premiere on the Piazza Grande at the 70th Locarno Film Festival in Locarno, Switzerland on August 9, 2017.

Reception

Critical response

Gautaman Bhaskaran of The Hindustan Times rated the film highly, saying "The Song of Scorpions is a story set on the undulating golden sands of the Thar Desert in Rajasthan, the sights and sounds of the mesmeric atmosphere caught most imaginatively by cinematographer Pietro Zuercher. I was bowled over by the light and shade contrasts he presents - the harshness of the daytime desert rubbing shoulders with the darkness of a night illuminated by the light of a million stars, twinkling away and guiding Singh’s folktale narrated through pain, pathos, love, humiliation, revenge, pardon and forgiveness. I think Singh has this unique ability to fathom the human mind, and in a way, his plot resembles a Shakespearean drama - sans the drama."

Boyd van Hoeij of The Hollywood Reporter commended the cinematography of the film saying that, "The film is absolutely gorgeous to look at, with Swiss cinematographers Pietro Zuercher and Carlotta Holy-Steinemann relishing the opportunity to film a country that looks so unlike their own"."

Allan Hunter of Screen Daily praised the cinematography, direction and acting performances in the film saying that, "Although leisurely in places, The Song Of Scorpions retains its grip, especially as we grow more involved in Nooran’s refusal to become a victim and her response to the many challenges placed in her path. The material could easily have lent itself to melodrama or sentimentality but Singh’s understated direction lends it a steely conviction that is further underpinned by some deft casting."

References

External links
 

2017 films
Rajasthani-language films
Films set in Rajasthan
Singaporean drama films
French drama films
Swiss drama films